The Compagnie des chemins de fer de l'Est (CF de l'Est), often referred to simply as the Est company, was an early French railway company. The company was formed in 1853 by the merger of Compagnie du chemin de fer de Paris à Strasbourg, operating the Paris-Strasbourg line, and Compagnie du chemin de fer de Montereau à Troyes. In 1938 it became part of the majority state-owned Société Nationale des Chemins de fer Français (SNCF).

History
In 1854 the company absorbed the Compagnie du chemin de fer de Strasbourg à Bale, in 1858 the Compagnie du chemin de fer de Mulhouse à Thann and in 1863 the railway network of the compagnie du chemin de fer des Ardennes.

Bibliography 
 
 
 
 
  The author reports on the transport of perishable goods by rail in Alsace in the 20th  century. It traces the evolution of the market of la Compagnie des chemins de fer de l'Est in 1852 to la Reichsbahn Elsass Lothringen (1871-1918).

Locomotives of the Est

References

 
Railway companies of France